Jeppiaar Institute of Technology (JIT) is a technical engineering college in Kunnam, Kanchipuram district, Tamil Nadu, India. It was founded in 2011 by the Jeppiaar Educational Trust, an organization created by the educationist Colonel Dr. Jeppiaar in 1987. The college is affiliated to Anna University.

Certifications
The Institute has been certified by the Management System Certification

Academic departments
The college consists of the following academic departments:
B.E - COMPUTER SCIENCE AND ENGINEERING   
B.E - ELECTRONICS AND COMMUNICATION ENGINEERING   
B.E - ELECTRICAL AND ELECTRONICS ENGINEERING   
B.E - MECHANICAL ENGINEERING   
B.TECH - INFORMATION TECHNOLOGY
B.TECH - ARTIFICIAL INTELLIGENCE AND DATA SCIENCE
M.B.A - MASTER OF BUSINESS ADMINISTRATION

Facilities
The college provides separate hostel facilities for male and female students, and a number of extra and co-curricular activities such as sports and clubs.

Scholarships
Scholarships are awarded to students to encourage merit and to make education accessible to students from all economic classes.

Initiatives

JIT Sports Academy

JIT Sports Academy was established in 2011.

JIT Global Solutions

Jeppiaar Foundation

The Jeppiaar Foundation aims to provide education to underprivileged and meritorious students.

References

Engineering colleges in Chennai
Colleges affiliated to Anna University
Educational institutions established in 2011
2011 establishments in Tamil Nadu